William Davies (born 14 March 1948), also known by the nickname of "Daz", is an English former professional rugby league footballer who played in the 1960s and 1970s.

Background
Billy Davies was born in Leigh, Lancashire, England.

Playing career

International honours
Billy Davies won a cap for England while at Swinton in 1968 against Wales, and won a cap for Great Britain while at Swinton in 1968 against France.

County Cup Final appearances
Billy Davies was an interchange/substitute in Swinton's 4-12 defeat by St. Helens in the 1964 Lancashire County Cup Final during the 1964–65 season at Central Park, Wigan on Saturday 24 October 1964, and played  in the 11-2 victory over Leigh in the 1969 Lancashire County Cup Final during the 1969–70 season at Central Park, Wigan on Saturday 1 November 1969.

BBC2 Floodlit Trophy Final appearances
Billy Davies played , i.e. number 5, in Swinton's 2-7 defeat by Castleford in the 1966 BBC2 Floodlit Trophy Final during the 1966–67 season at Wheldon Road, Castleford on Tuesday 20 December 1966.

References

External links
Statistics at wigan.rlfans.com

1948 births
Living people
England national rugby league team players
English rugby league players
Great Britain national rugby league team players
Rugby league five-eighths
Rugby league players from Leigh, Greater Manchester
Swinton Lions players
Wigan Warriors players